Cruelle was a schooner-cannoniere (gun-schooner), launched in 1793. The British captured her in June 1800 and commissioned her as HMS Cruelle. She spent a little over a year in the Mediterranean, serving at Malta and Alexandria before the Royal Navy sold her in 1801.

French service and capture
Cruelle was one of seven Vésuve-class brick-canonniers, though she herself was described as being schooner-rigged. However, her captors described her as a brig.

In late 1794 she sailed from Brest to Guadeloupe to alert the French there that a naval squadron under the command of Capitaine de Vaisseau Duchesne was on its way with supplies and reinforcements. At some point thereafter, Cruelle was converted to a bomb vessel.

On 1 June 1800 about  southward of Les Hières  captured Cruelle when Cruelle was only eight hours out of Toulon. Captain R. Dudley Oliver of Mermaid described Cruelle as a brig of six guns, four of which she had thrown overboard during the chase. She had a crew of 43 men under the command of Ensigne de vaisseau Francis Xavier Jeard. She was a bomb vessel but had left her mortar at Toulon as she was carrying supplies for Malta.

The British took Cruelle into service under her existing name. All subsequent British accounts refer to Cruelle as a cutter of ten guns.

British service
Cruelle was present at the surrender of the island of Malta on 5 September 1800. As a result, she was entitled to share in the prize money for the island.

Cruelle was registered on 3 October 1800 and commissioned in February 1801 under Lieutenant Charles Inglis for the Mediterranean.

On 8 March she was at Abu Qir Bay under the command of Lieutenant David M'Gie (or McGhie), Cruelle protected the left flank during the landing of troops in Aboukir Bay, together with the cutter  and the gun-vessel . The cutter , schooner , and the gun-vessel  covered the right flank.

Also in March Lieutenant Edward (or Edmond or Edmund) Boger was appointed to command her. On 9 May Cruelle, and  unsuccessfully chased the French corvette Heliopolis, which eluded them and slipped into Alexandria.

In 1850 the Admiralty authorized the award of the Naval General Service medal with clasp "Egypt" to all naval officers and men who had served there between 8 March and 2 September. In the medal listing Boger is listed as Cruelles captain. Apparently he personally also received the Turkish gold medal for the gallantry he displayed there.

Fate
Cruelle was sold in 1801 at Alexandria. She was deleted from the lists on 13 May 1802.

Notes, citations, and references

Notes

Citations

References
 de Peyreleau (baron), Eugène Edouard Boyer (1825) Les Antilles françaises: particulièrement la Guadeloupe, depuis leur découverte jusqu'au ler novembre 1825. Volume 3. (Ladvocat).
 
  
 

1793 ships
Cutters of the Royal Navy
Captured ships
Vésuve-class gunbrigs